Death Takes a Holiday is a 1934 film starring Fredric March, Evelyn Venable and Guy Standing.

Death Takes a Holiday may also refer to:
 Death Takes a Holiday (1971 film)
 Death Takes a Holiday (musical)
 "Death Takes a Holiday", an episode of the ninth season of M*A*S*H
 "Death Takes a Holiday", an episode of the fourth season of Supernatural

See also
Death Makes a Holiday, a non-fiction book by David J. Skal